Pisky is a village in Myrhorod Raion (district) in Poltava Oblast.

History
The village was previously named  "" ("Sandbox" in Ukrainian) and its first recorded mention was in 1092.

Pisky was previously located in Lokhvytsia Raion. The raion was abolished and its territory was merged into Myrhorod Raion on 18 July 2020 as part of the administrative reform of Ukraine, which reduced the number of raions of Poltava Oblast to four.

References

Lokhvitsky Uyezd

Villages in Myrhorod Raion